Kırkpınar is a village in the Nurdağı District, Gaziantep Province, Turkey. The village had a population of 317 in 2022.

References

Villages in Nurdağı District